Jean-Noël Amonome (born 24 December 1997) is a Gabonese professional footballer who plays as a goalkeeper for AmaZulu, and the Gabon national team.

Career
Amonome began his career with the Gabonese club FC 105 Libreville, before transferring to the South African club AmaZulu. He went on loan to Royal Eagles in 2020. He made his professional debut with Royal Eagles in a 1–0 National First Division win over University of Pretoria on 15 March 2020.

International career
Amonome debuted with the Gabon national team in a 3–0 2021 Africa Cup of Nations qualification win over DR Congo on 25 March 2021.

References

External links
 
 

1997 births
Living people
Sportspeople from Libreville
Gabonese footballers
Gabon international footballers
AmaZulu F.C. players
Royal Eagles F.C. players
Uthongathi F.C. players
Gabon Championnat National D1 players
National First Division players
South African Premier Division players
Association football goalkeepers
Gabonese expatriates in South Africa
Gabonese expatriate footballers
Expatriate soccer players in South Africa
2021 Africa Cup of Nations players